David Roche may refer to:

 David Roche (footballer) (born 1970), English footballer
 David John Roche (1918–1942), United States Navy officer awarded the Navy Cross
 Sir David O'Grady Roche, 5th Baronet (born 1947)
 David Roche (Medal of Honor), see List of Medal of Honor recipients for the Indian Wars
 Sir David Roche, 1st Baronet, Member of the UK Parliament for Limerick City